Boar's Head Provision Co., Inc.  (also Boar's Head Brand, or Frank Brunckhorst Co., LLC) is a supplier of delicatessen meats, cheeses and condiments. The company was founded in 1905 in Brooklyn, New York, and now distributes its products throughout the United States. It has been based in Sarasota, Florida, since 2001.

History

Company founder Frank Brunckhorst began distributing cold cuts under the Boar's Head name in 1905. By 1933, distribution of Boar's Head products had grown, and Brunckhorst and his partners, Bruno Bischoff and Theodore Weiler, decided to open a manufacturing plant. The first plant was started in a small building in Brooklyn with only three employees.

Brunckhorst's son (also Frank Brunckhorst) took over the business; Frank Brunckhorst II died in 1972 at age 65. During the 1990s, the expanding company added processing plants in Virginia, Arkansas, and Michigan, and it began to shift its strategy toward its current business model that stresses exclusive relationships with major supermarket chains.  In 2001, the company moved its headquarters from Brooklyn to Sarasota, Florida, in part because of its exclusive relationship with the Publix supermarket chain in Florida (which it has been partners with since 1994).

For many years, the voice-over in Boar's Head commercials was supplied by the voice performer Joseph Sirola.  In 2008, the company opened an "experimental" retail outlet in Brooklyn, which closed the following year.

Products

Boar's Head sells cheeses and many common meats, such as black forest ham, roast beef, and salami. In August 2009, Boar's Head released its "EverRoast Oven Roasted Chicken Breast" with a national marketing campaign, and in 2012 launched its "Bold" line of globally inspired meats and cheeses. The company also sells a line of condiments, including barbecue sauce, horseradish, and mustard. A small selective line of pickles are also part of the Boar's Head product line and one was rated the best overall in a 2017 America's Test Kitchen episode.

Legacy 
Barbara Brunckhorst, the daughter of Boar’s Head founder Frank Brunckhorst, is one of the founders and trustees of the Barbara Brunckhorst Foundation. The foundation has spent millions on a variety of charities, including nature conservation and others. In early 2022, the foundation donated $104 million to create the Stravitz-Sanyal Institute for Liver Disease and Metabolic Health at VCU.

See also
 "Boar's Head Carol"
 Boar's Head Feast
 Boar's Head Inn
 Boar's Head Resort

References

External links
Boar's Head corporate web page at boarshead.com
Boar's Head Atlanta Distributor at boarsheadatl.com

Brand name meats
Food manufacturers of the United States
Companies based in Sarasota, Florida
Ham producers
Condiment companies of the United States